Alfred J. Lauby was a member of the Wisconsin State Assembly.

Biography
Lauby was born on October 7, 1908, in Antigo, Wisconsin. (address: 209 10th Ave., Antigo.) He graduated from St. John's Parochial School and Antigo High School. He became a dairy products sales-man, painter and decorator, and a tavern operator.  During World War II, he served with the United States Navy. He died in 1985.

Political career
Lauby was a member of the Assembly from 1955 to 1958 as a member of the Democratic Party. In 1958, he was defeated for re-election as an Independent.

References

People from Antigo, Wisconsin
Democratic Party members of the Wisconsin State Assembly
Military personnel from Wisconsin
United States Navy sailors
United States Navy personnel of World War II
1908 births
1985 deaths
20th-century American politicians